Long-term support (LTS) is a product lifecycle management policy in which a stable release of computer software is maintained for a longer period of time than the standard edition. The term is typically reserved for open-source software, where it describes a software edition that is supported for months or years longer than the software's standard edition.

Short term support (STS) is a term that distinguishes the support policy for the software's standard edition. STS software has a comparatively short life cycle, and may be afforded new features that are omitted from the LTS edition to avoid potentially compromising the stability or compatibility of the LTS release.

Characteristics
LTS applies the tenets of reliability engineering to the software development process and software release life cycle. Long-term support extends the period of software maintenance; it also alters the type and frequency of software updates (patches) to reduce the risk, expense, and disruption of software deployment, while promoting the dependability of the software. It does not necessarily imply technical support.

At the beginning of a long-term support period, the software developers impose a feature freeze: They make patches to correct software bugs and vulnerabilities, but do not introduce new features that may cause regression. The software maintainer either distributes patches individually, or packages them in maintenance releases, point releases, or service packs. At the conclusion of the support period, the product either reaches end-of-life, or receives a reduced level of support for a period of time (e.g., high-priority security patches only).

Rationale

Before upgrading software, a decision-maker might consider the risk and cost of the upgrade.

As software developers add new features and fix software bugs, they may introduce new bugs or break old functionality. When such a flaw occurs in software, it is called a regression. Two ways that a software publisher or maintainer can reduce the risk of regression are to release major updates less frequently, and to allow users to test an alternate, updated version of the software. LTS software applies these two risk-reduction strategies. The LTS edition of the software is published in parallel with the STS (short-term support) edition. Since major updates to the STS edition are published more frequently, it offers LTS users a preview of changes that might be incorporated into the LTS edition when those changes are judged to be of sufficient quality.

While using older versions of software may avoid the risks associated with upgrading, it may introduce the risk of losing support for the old software. Long-term support addresses this by assuring users and administrators that the software will be maintained for a specific period of time, and that updates selected for publication will carry a significantly reduced risk of regression. The maintainers of LTS software only publish updates that either have low IT risk or that reduce IT risk (such as security patches). Patches for LTS software are published with the understanding that installing them is less risky than not installing them.

Software with separate LTS versions
This table only lists those have a specific LTS version in addition to a normal release cycle. Many projects, such as CentOS, provide a long period of support for every release.

1. The support period for Ubuntu's parent distribution, Debian, is one year after the release of the next stable version. Since Debian 6.0 "Squeeze", LTS support (bug fixes and security patches) was added to all version releases. The total LTS support time is generally around 5 years for every version. Due to the irregular release cycle of Debian, support times might vary from that average and the LTS support is done not by the Debian team but by a separate group of volunteers.

See also

References

Further reading
 
 
 
 
 
 
 
 
 

Computer security procedures
Product lifecycle management
Reliability engineering
Software maintenance
Software quality